Romántico is a 2005 documentary film directed by Mark Becker and starring Arturo Arias and Carmelo Muñiz Sanchez.

Recognition

Critical response

New York Newsday Romantico is visual poetry on the run… And, as any work of art does when it’s successful, 
improves our perceptions of the world.”"

Slant Magazine offered in 2006 that Romántico might be the documentary of the year, in that its "sensitively detailed surveillance of one man's personal misfortune" illuminates a national crisis.  They favorably compared it with Carlos Reygadas' Battle in Heaven in that both films deal with the same social circle and maintain a "vigilant aesthetic".  In revisiting the film in 2010, they offered that the film was a "well-done character study" that could teach "a lot about how someone else thinks and experiences the world."

The New York Times wrote that Romántico was "a sympathetic portrait of Carmelo Muñiz Sánchez, an illegal Mexican immigrant living in San Francisco who, after scuffling for three years as a mariachi musician, returns home to care for his ailing mother."  They found the film to be representative of the stories of "countless illegal immigrants" who are a "struggling shadow population that is all but invisible in the United States."

Film Threat made note that the film was originally to be about the life of two immigrant musicians in San Francisco, but due to Carmelo Muñiz Sanchez deciding to return home to Mexico during the filming, the film "evolved into a richly observed slice of life tale about a man returning home".

Awards and nominations

 2005, nominated for 'Grand Jury Prize' for best documentary at Sundance Film Festival
 2006, nominated for Independent Spirit Award for best documentary at Independent Spirit Awards
 2006, nominated for 'Truer Than Fiction Award' at Independent Spirit Awards

References

External links

 

2005 films
2000s Spanish-language films
Documentary films about music and musicians
Films shot in Mexico
Mariachi
American documentary films
2006 documentary films
2006 films
Documentary films about Mexican Americans
2000s English-language films
2005 multilingual films
American multilingual films
2000s American films